Avon School District may refer to:
 Avon School District (Massachusetts)
 Avon School District (New Jersey)
 Avon School District (South Dakota), also known as Avon School District 4-1
 Abingdon-Avon Community Unit School District 276, a public school district in Abingdon, Illinois
 Avon Public Schools, a public school district in Avon, Connecticut
 Avon Central School District, a public school district in Avon, New York
 Avon Local School District, a public school district in Avon, Ohio
 Avon Community School Corporation, a public school district in Avon, Indiana